, son of regent Kaneyoshi, was a kugyō or Japanese court noble of the Muromachi period (1336–1573). He held a regent position kampaku from 1458 to 1463. In 1475 to escape unrest in Kyoto he moved to Tosa Province, founding the Tosa-Ichijō clan. He eventually returned to Kyoto, but his son Fusaie stayed in the province.

Family
 Father: Ichijo Kaneyoshi
 Mother: Nakamikado Nobutoshi's daughter (1405–1473)
 Wife: Shoji, daughter of Reisen Tameyuki
 Concubine: Daughter of Kagumi Munetaka
 Children:
 Ichijo Masafusa (1443–1469)
 Ichijo Fusaie by Daughter of Kagumi Munetaka

References

  (This source is unclear about the Tosa-Ichijō clan)

Fujiwara clan
Ichijō family
People of Muromachi-period Japan
1423 births
1480 deaths
15th-century Japanese people